Emilio Núñez Portuondo (September 13, 1898, in Philadelphia, Pennsylvania, U.S. – August 19, 1978, in Panama City, Panama) was a Cuban politician, lawyer, and diplomat.  He was the 13th Prime Minister of Cuba in 1958. He received the National Order of the Legion of Honour of France among other decorations from many countries.

Education and career 
Dr. Núñez attended La Salle School in Cuba and graduated as doctor of civil and public law in 1919 from the University of Havana. He served as a representative and senator from the Las Villas Province and also as the Cuban Minister Plenipotentiary and Envoy Extraordinary to Panama, Peru, Netherlands, Belgium and Luxembourg. He was secretary of the Constitutional Convention of 1940. Dr. Ramón Grau San Martín was the president of the Constitutional Convention which drafted the 1940 Constitution of Cuba.
Dr. Núñez Portuondo served as the Cuban Permanent Representative with the rank of ambassador to the United Nations in 1952–1958; and was also Minister of Labor in 1954. He served as president of the U.N. Security Council in September 1956 and 1957. He was Prime Minister of Cuba from March 6 to March 12, 1958.

Dr. Núñez Portuondo is best remembered as the President of the UN Security Council during the Hungarian uprising in 1956. Dr. Núñez Portuondo helped  József Cardinal Mindzenty of Hungary in assisting refugees into Cuba and the United States.

Family
He was the son of General Emilio Núñez Rodriguez, vice president of Cuba during the second administration of General Mario García Menocal in 1917-1921, and who was also governor of Havana from 1899 to 1902 as well as Minister of Agriculture, Commerce and Labor 1913-1917. Dr. Núñez Portuondo's brother was the 1948 Cuban presidential candidate, Dr. Ricardo Núñez Portuondo. He was married three times and had five children, Emilio Núñez Blanco, Ricardo Núñez Garcia, Maria Stana Núñez Garcia, Brunilda Núñez Fábrega and Fernando Núñez Fábrega, a former Minister of Foreign Relations of the Republic of Panama. His eldest son, Emilio Núñez Blanco, elected to the Cuban House of Representatives in 1958, though unable to take office, was the second husband of Myrta Diaz-Balart (the first wife of Fidel Castro). He is buried in Panama City next to his third wife, Panamanian, Olga Fábrega y Fábrega (married December 3, 1937).

References
 Los Propietarios de Cuba 1958, Guillermo Jimenez Soler (Havana, Cuba: Editorial de Ciencias Sociales, 2007) 
 Cuba The Pursuit of Freedom, Hugh Thomas (London, Great Britain:Eyre & Spottiswoode Ltd., 1971) SBN 413-27470-5
 http://www.amigospais-guaracabuya.org/oagrn007.php
 
 http://www.latinamericanstudies.org/cuban-rebels/NYT-11-1-58b.htm
 http://select.nytimes.com/gst/abstract.html?res=F20B11FB385B1B728DDDA80894DC405B848AF1D3

Cuban diplomats
20th-century Cuban lawyers
Prime Ministers of Cuba
1898 births
1978 deaths
Cuban senators
Members of the Cuban House of Representatives
Permanent Representatives of Cuba to the United Nations
1950s in Cuba
20th-century Cuban politicians
University of Havana alumni